Pərizamanlı (also, Pərzamanlı) is a village and the least populous municipality in the Gadabay Rayon of Azerbaijan. It has a population of 667.

References

Populated places in Gadabay District